The General Assembly House, colloquially called "Shedifice" by the members of Parliament, was the first building to house the New Zealand Parliament in Auckland. It was in use by Parliament from 1854 until 1864 during the time that Auckland was the capital of New Zealand. It was also used by the Auckland Provincial Council, with Auckland Province owning the building from 1858. After the abolition of the provincial government system, the building was used by the government's survey department and was then used by Auckland University College. The General Assembly House was demolished in 1917 to make way for Anzac Avenue. Today, a reserve adjacent to Parliament Street commemorates the location where the New Zealand Parliament met initially.

History

Context
Auckland was New Zealand's second capital from 1841 until 1865, when Parliament was permanently moved to Wellington after an argument that lasted for a decade. The initial form of government was an executive council formed of public servants appointed by and responsible to the governor. This changed when the New Zealand Constitution Act 1852, an Act of the Parliament of the United Kingdom that granted self-government to the Colony of New Zealand, was received. This allowed for a bicameral General Assembly (or Parliament), consisting of the governor, an appointed Legislative Council and an elected House of Representatives, with an Executive Council nominally appointed by the governor. It also allowed for provincial governments, and six provinces were initially established.

Use for Parliament

On 18 January 1854, Parliament was first summoned to meet in Auckland on 24 May of that year, i.e. on Queen Victoria's birthday. There was no suitable building for the General Assembly, as it was then called, to meet in Auckland. Reader Wood, who was deputy surveyor-general, was tasked with designing a suitable meeting house that could be used by the survey department during the parliamentary recess. Tenders were called for in early February 1854 and the contract awarded on 3 March for £2,572. Despite labour shortage (the Victorian gold rush attracted much of the labour force) and poor weather, the building progressed quickly and was ready in time.

The first meeting of parliamentarians was held on 24 May, followed by a levee of Colonel Robert Wynyard, the administrator of the government. In the evening, a ball was held in the chamber of the House of Representatives. Of the 420 invited guests, only 200 could make it due to the poor weather. The chamber was a hall that normally had seating as opposed to being fitted out as a meeting place, and hence it could be used for a ball.

The House of Representatives decided that it should first elect a speaker before Parliament could be formally opened. Charles Clifford found unanimous support and Wynyard as acting governor formally opened Parliament on Saturday, 27 May 1854.

Table footnotes

The General Assembly House was also used for meetings of the Auckland Provincial Council. This arrangement generally worked well, as many members of Parliament were also members of one of the provincial councils of New Zealand, and the provincial council sessions were thus generally scheduled to not clash with sessions of Parliament. Only when sessions had to be called at short notice did clashes occur. The first such clash occurred in mid-August 1855, when Parliament was still in session and the superintendent of Auckland Province, William Brown, called the fourth session of the Auckland Provincial Council, which was held at the Mechanics' Institute instead. The second clash occurred in April 1856, when the fifth session of the Auckland Provincial Council had not finished when the first session of the 2nd New Zealand Parliament began; the provincial councillors once again moved to the Mechanics' Institute. The third and last clash occurred in late 1863, when the provincial council had not finished its session in time for the parliamentary session that was to begin on 19 October 1863. On Friday, 16 October, the provincial council adjourned until Saturday, 28 November. Parliament had not finished its session by then, but took a rest day for the provincial council to be able to use the chamber. Rather than again adjourn its business, the provincial council decided to meet, from the following week, in the library room attached to the General Assembly House.

Ownership changes and fate

In late 1858, the ownership of the building transferred to Auckland Province, but with an agreement that Parliament would continue to use it, and it continued to be referred to as the General Assembly House. After 1858, some additions were made to the building. The system of provincial government was abolished in 1876 and ownership transferred back to the Crown. In 1883, the building additions that initially housed Auckland's district (or magistrates) court were made available to the newly established Auckland University College, and laboratories and lecture rooms for the chemistry department were established here. The original part of the building remained for use by the Survey and Crown Lands Department. Parliament passed the Auckland University College Reserves Act 1885 and that allowed for the main building and the land it was on to also be transferred to the college, which happened in 1890. The college used the meeting room of the House of Representatives for general and mathematics lectures. The lower story of the original building became the college library and the registrar's office. The former Bellamy's (parliamentary refreshment room, i.e. a club where liquor could be purchased) in an adjacent building became the office of the college chairman. The college's geology museum was housed in the buildings, as were lecture rooms for classics and a girls' common room.

The Mayor of Auckland City, James Gunson, held a civic reception in the buildings on 15 November 1917 to mark the historic significance just prior to demolition. The buildings were demolished to make way for Anzac Avenue, a new eastern arterial road. A year later, Eden Street was renamed Parliament Street. A plaque in the reserve adjacent to Anzac Avenue and Parliament Street commemorates the location of the General Assembly House.

Architecture

The quality of the first meeting house for the New Zealand Parliament found little favour. The Daily Southern Cross called it a "wretched, ill-constructed building". The building was drafty and the roof leaked. Henry Sewell, New Zealand's first premier after responsible government had been granted in 1856, described the meeting chamber of the House of Representatives and the building in general as follows:

It is believed that the original building measured . The building had two storeys and curiously, the Upper House (i.e. the Legislative Council) met on the lower storey, and the Lower House (i.e. the House of Representatives) met on the upper storey.

Notes

References

External links

Auckland University College Reserves Act 1885
Photographs of General Assembly House held in Auckland Libraries' heritage collections.

Government buildings completed in 1854
Politics of New Zealand
Buildings and structures in Auckland
Government buildings in New Zealand
Buildings and structures demolished in 1917
1850s architecture in New Zealand
1854 establishments in New Zealand
Auckland CBD